The 2021 Atlantic Coast Conference men's soccer season was the 68th season of men's varsity soccer in the conference.

Clemson are the defending champions of the Atlantic Conference and the Pittsburgh are the defending champions of the Coastal Conference.  Clemson is the defending ACC Tournament Champion.

Clemson and Pittsburgh both retained their regular season titles in their respective conferences.  However, Clemson could not defend its ACC Tournament crown, with Notre Dame prevailing in the 2021 Tournament.  Eight ACC teams were invited to the NCAA Tournament.  Clemson had the best showing of the eight, winning their third title in program history.

Teams

Stadiums and locations 

1.  Florida State, Georgia Tech and Miami do not sponsor men's soccer

Personnel 

Notes
Records shown are prior to the 2021 season
Years at school includes the 2021 season
ACC records include only years with current school.

Preseason

Hermann Trophy 

The preseason watch list for the Hermann Trophy was released on August 26, 2021.

Preseason Poll 

The 2021 ACC Preseason Poll was announced on August 18, 2021.  The league's 12 head coaches voted Pittsburgh as the preseason favorite, with 7 of the 12 votes.  Full results of the preseason poll are shown below:

Preseason awards 

Preseason All-ACC Watchlist

Regular season 

All times Eastern time.

Week 1 (Aug. 24 – Aug. 30)

Players of the Week

Week 2 (Aug. 31 – Sept. 6)

Players of the Week

Week 3 (Sept. 7 – Sept. 13)

Players of the Week

Week 4 (Sept. 14 – Sept. 20)

Players of the Week

Week 5 (Sept. 21 – Sept. 27)

Players of the Week

Week 6 (Sept. 28 – Oct. 4)

Players of the Week

Week 7 (Oct. 5 – Oct. 11)

Players of the Week

Week 8 (Oct. 12 – Oct. 18)

Players of the Week

Week 9 (Oct. 19 – Oct. 25)

Players of the Week

Week 10 (Oct. 26 – Nov. 2)

Players of the Week

Rankings

National

United Soccer Coaches

Top Drawer Soccer

Postseason

ACC Tournament

NCAA Tournament 

The ACC sent eight teams to the NCAA Tournament, which was the most of any conference.  ACC teams also were four of the top eight seeds in the tournament.

Awards

Postseason awards 

Postseason awards were released on November 10, prior to the ACC Tournament Semifinals.

All-ACC awards and teams

MLS SuperDraft 

A total of nineteen players were selected from ACC teams in the 2022 MLS SuperDraft.  Their six first round picks and nineteen overall picks were the most of any conference in the draft.  The nineteen total picks is the second highest in league history.  Clemson had the most players selected with six.

Total picks by school

List of selections

Homegrown players 

The Homegrown Player Rule is a Major League Soccer program that allows MLS teams to sign local players from their own development academies directly to MLS first team rosters. Before the creation of the rule in 2008, every player entering Major League Soccer had to be assigned through one of the existing MLS player allocation processes, such as the MLS SuperDraft.

To place a player on its homegrown player list, making him eligible to sign as a homegrown player, players must have resided in that club's home territory and participated in the club's youth development system for at least one year. Players can play college soccer and still be eligible to sign a homegrown contract.

References

 
2021 NCAA Division I men's soccer season